Sagi Aharon Muki (or Moki; ; born 17 May 1992) is an Israeli half-middleweight judoka. Muki is the 2019 World Champion. He also won the 2015 and 2018 European championships.

In August 2011 Muki won the European Cup U20 in Berlin in the under 73 kilogram (161-pound) category. He won gold medals in February 2013 at the European Open in Tbilisi, Georgia, in June 2013 at the European Open Tallinn, and in October 2013 at the European Open Minsk in the under 73 weight class. In May 2014, he won the Baku Grand Slam in Azerbaijan in the under 73 kg category, and the following month he won another International Judo Federation World Tour gold medal, this time at the Havana Grand Prix in the under 73 kg category.

Muki is a two-time Israeli judo champion. In June 2015, representing Israel at the 2015 European Games in Baku, Azerbaijan, he won the gold medal and the European championship in judo in the under 73 kg weight class. Competing for Israel at the 2016 Summer Olympics he came in 5th place. He was ranked No. 1 in the world in March 2019.

Early life
Muki was born and raised in Netanya, Israel, to a family of Mizrahi Jewish (Yemenite-Jewish) descent. His parents are Rahamim and Orit Muki. At the age of eight, he chose to focus on judo, which he had been practicing for four years, despite excelling in football for a Netanya junior soccer team. He attended Tchernichovsky High School in Netanya. As of June 2015 he still resided with his parents, for reasons of convenience and proximity to the Wingate Institute sports training facility. He served in the Israel Defense Forces as a Sergeant in the Vehicle Division at the Sde Dov airbase.

Judo career
For 19 years, since the age of four, Muki has been coached by Israeli judoka Oren Smadja, who won the Olympic bronze medal in the under  weight category in judo at the 1992 Summer Olympics in Barcelona. Smadja is also the national team coach, and Muki views Smadja as a fatherly figure. His club is Maccabi Netanya, and he met future Israeli judoka world champion Yarden Gerbi there when he was four years old. He noted in 2013: "It's important to me to serve the State as an athlete. This year, I got to play the national anthem in Georgia, Estonia, and Belarus, and last year in Germany. Every time the audience stands for the anthem, it's fun and brings me great pride".

In April 2011 he came in fifth in the World U-20 Junior Championships in the under 73-kilogram (161-pound) category. In August 2011 Muki won the European Cup U20 in Berlin in the under 73 kg category. In September 2011, he came in third in the European U20 Championships in Lommel, Belgium, in the under 73 kg category. In December 2012, he won the Israeli Championship in the under  category in Ra'anana, Israel.

Muki won a gold medal at the European Open in February 2013 in Tbilisi, Georgia, in the under 73 kg category. He also won gold medals at the European Open Tallinn in June 2013, and the European Open Minsk in October 2013 in the under 73 weight class. He won the Israeli Championship in the under 81 kg category in Ra'anana, Israel in December 2013.

In May 2014, Muki won the Baku Grand Slam in Azerbaijan in the under 73 kg category. In June 2014, he won another International Judo Federation World Tour gold medal, at the Havana Grand Prix in the under 73 kg category. In October 2014, he was ranked number three in the world in his weight class, and in May 2015 he had moved up to number two in the world.

European Champion
In June 2015, representing Israel at the 2015 European Games in judo in the under 73 kg category in Baku, Muki won the first gold medal for Israel in the inaugural European Games, and in doing so won the 2015 European Judo Championship. In the quarterfinals he defeated then-reigning European champion Dex Elmont of the Netherlands. He defeated Nugzar Tatalashvili of Georgia in the final, throwing him for an ippon twenty-eight seconds prior to the end of their match, and after his victory he pointed with a smile at the Israeli flag on his judogi. He became the first Israeli men's European Judo Champion since Ariel Ze'evi, who won the championship four times. Muki received NIS 40,000 (approximately $10,500) from the Israel Olympic Committee for his achievement, the highest amount of any Israeli athlete, and a monthly stipend of NIS 8,500.

In October 2015, Muki won the bronze medal in the Paris Grand Slam after defeating Shuai Sun from China. Two weeks later on 31 October 2015, he won a bronze medal in the Abu Dhabi Grand Slam after defeating Belgian Dirk Van Tichelt.

Rio 2016
In August 2016, Muki competed for the first time in his career for Israel at the 2016 Summer Olympics at the age of 24. In the first round he defeated former European champion Rok Drakšič of Slovenia with an ippon. In the second round he beat Igor Wandtke of Germany. In the quarter-finals, Muki defeated Nicholas Delpopolo of the United States. In the semi-finals, Muki lost to Rustam Orujov of Azerbaijan, and subsequently he was also defeated by Lasha Shavdatuashvili of Georgia for the bronze medal. Muki finished in fifth place.

On 7 October 2017, Muki competed at the 2017 Tashkent Grand Prix, his first competition since the 2016 olympics, and won the gold medal. On 27 April 2018, Muki took part in the European championships in Tel Aviv and won the gold medal in the under 81 kg weight category. In the first round he defeated Jonathan Allardon of France by ippon, in the second round he defeated Matthias Casse of Belgium by waza-ari. He went on to defeat László Csoknyai of Hungary by ippon in the quarter final and Aslan Lappinagov of Russia by shidos in the semi-final. In the final Muki defeated Sami Chouchi of Belgium by waza-ari in golden score.

World Champion
At the 2019 World Judo Championships in Tokyo, Muki won the gold medal in the under 81 kg weight category. Coming to the competition, Muki was ranked 2nd in the world and 5 out of his 6 matches that day, he won by Ippon. He won his first 4 matches by Ippon and in the semi-final he defeated Mohamed Abdelaal of Egypt by Waza-ari. In the final, Muki faced Matthias Casse of Belgium and won by Ippon due to 2 Waza-ari scores.

In 2021, he won a bronze medal in World Masters, held in Doha, Qatar.

After World Championship
Muki represented Israel at the 2020 Summer Olympics, competing at the men's 81 kg weight category. After beating 2017 Pan American champion, Brazilian Eduardo Yudy Santos, in his first match, Muki lost to Austrian Shamil Borchashvili in the round of 16, ending his part of the individual contest.

Titles
Source:

See also
List of select Jewish judokas
Sport in Israel
Israel Judo Association

References

External links

 
 
 
 Sagi Muki at the European Judo Union
 "Inside Video: Sagi Muki" (video), JudoInside, 4 January 2015
 "Sagi Muki wins the Men's −73kg final | Judo | Baku 2015 European Games" (video), Baku 2015 European Games, 26 June 2015
 

1992 births
Living people
Israeli male judoka
Jewish martial artists
Sportspeople from Netanya
European Games gold medalists for Israel
European Games medalists in judo
Judoka at the 2015 European Games
Judoka at the 2016 Summer Olympics
Olympic judoka of Israel
World judo champions
Israeli people of Yemeni-Jewish descent
Israeli Mizrahi Jews
Judoka at the 2020 Summer Olympics
Medalists at the 2020 Summer Olympics
Olympic medalists in judo
Olympic bronze medalists for Israel